Hu Xianxu (born August 17, 2000) is a Chinese actor.

Career
In 2009, Hu made his first appearance in the CCTV program Fei Chang Liu Jia Yi. He next participated in program called Dang Hong Bu Ran, coming in second, and subsequently signed a contract with an acting company.

In 2011, Hu made his acting debut in the film Xiao Jian De He Chang Tuan. In 2012, Hu starred in his first television series Chong Fan Da Fu Cun.

Hu first gained recognition for his performance in the family drama A Love For Separation (2016). He gained further recognition with his role as a young Emperor in the wuxia historical drama Nirvana in Fire 2 (2017).

In 2018, Hu starred in the modern romance drama  Old Boy. His performance as a rebellious and wayward teenager earned positive reviews. The same year, he starred in the palace drama Ruyi's Royal Love in the Palace playing a filial prince, and romance drama Never Gone as the younger version of the male protagonist.

In 2019, Hu starred in the drama Hikaru No Go, based on the Japanese manga series.

Other activities

Ambassadorship
On April 18, 2019, Hu was appointed as the Spokesperson of the 10th International College Students Fashion Design Festival.

On October 21, Hu was appointed as UNFPA China’s Youth Champion.

On November 5, Hu was appointed as the Tourist Ambassador of La Vienne Province, in France.

Charity
On November 13 of this year, DelSEY, a French bag and luggage brand of 72 years of history, invited Hu Xianxu to join their 1 million yuan donation to schools in Guyuan County in Hebei Province through the China Youth Development Foundation. This donation covered 16 schools, most of which were boarding schools, and covered more than 6,000 students.

Filmography

Film

Television series

Reality show

Discography

Awards

References

2000 births
21st-century Chinese male actors
Living people
Chinese male television actors
Chinese male film actors
Male actors from Tianjin
Chinese male child actors
Central Academy of Drama alumni